The South Bound Railroad was a Southeastern railroad that operated in South Carolina and Georgia in the late 19th century and early 20th century.

History
The South Bound Railroad was chartered by the South Carolina General Assembly in 1882 and by the Georgia Legislature in 1888.

The 136-mile line from Savannah, Georgia, to Columbia, South Carolina, opened in 1891. The following year it was leased to the Florida Central and Peninsular Railroad. By the end of the decade, the South Bound Railroad had reached Camden, South Carolina, to meet the Chesterfield and Kershaw Railroad.

In late 1899, stockholders of the Raleigh and Gaston Railroad met in Raleigh, to consider the merger of the Raleigh and Gaston with the South Bound Railroad, along with the Raleigh and Augusta Air Line Railroad, the Durham and Northern Railway, the Roanoke and Tar River Railroad, the Seaboard and Roanoke Railroad, the Louisburg Railroad, the Carolina Central Railroad, the Palmetto Railroad, the Chesterfield and Kershaw Railroad, the Georgia, Carolina and Northern Railway, the Seaboard Air Line Belt Railroad, the Georgia and Alabama Railroad, the Florida Central and Peninsular Railroad, the Georgia and Alabama Terminal Company, the Logansville and Lawrenceville Railroad, the Richmond, Petersburg and Carolina Railroad and the Pittsboro Railroad.

The resulting company became known as the Seaboard Air Line Railroad. The South Bound was merged into the Seaboard in 1901.

Station listing

References

Defunct South Carolina railroads
Defunct Georgia (U.S. state) railroads
Railway companies established in 1882
Railway companies disestablished in 1901
Predecessors of the Seaboard Air Line Railroad